Qater Owlan (also Romanized as Qāţer Owlan, Qāţer Ālan, and Qāţer Olan; also known as Ghater Olan and Qātir Aulan) is a village in Razan Rural District, in the Central District of Razan County, Hamadan Province, Iran. At the 2006 census, its population was 47, in 9 families.

References 

Populated places in Razan County